Frog City may refer to:

Frog City Software, a software company
Frog City, Florida, an unincorporated community in Florida, United States
Frog City, Rhode Island, a village in Rhode Island, United States